Narendra Modi  the leader of Bharatiya Janata Party was sworn in as Chief Minister of Gujarat for first time on 7 October 2001.

Here is the names of ministers

Cabinet ministers
Suresh Mehta 
Nitin Patel 
Kaushik Patel 
Anandiben Patel 
Narottam Patel
Fakirbhai Waghela
Kanjibhai Patel

References

Modi 01
Modi I
Chief Ministership of Narendra Modi
2001 establishments in Gujarat
2002 disestablishments in India
Cabinets established in 2001
Cabinets disestablished in 2002